Eleocharis rivalis is a sedge of the family Cyperaceae that is native to the Kimberley region of Western Australia.

The species was first described in 2011 by Karen Wilson.

References

Plants described in 2011
Flora of Western Australia
rivalis
Taxa named by Karen Louise Wilson